Denison High School is a public high school in Denison, Texas, United States and classified as a 5A school by the University Interscholastic League (UIL) . It is part of the Denison Independent School District located in north central Grayson County.  In 2015, the school was rated "Met Standard" by the Texas Education Agency.

Athletics
The Denison Yellow Jackets compete in these sports - 

Volleyball, Cross Country, Football, Basketball, Powerlifting, Swimming, Soccer, Golf, Track, Tennis, Softball & Baseball

State titles
Denison (UIL)
Football - 
1984(4A)

Denison Terrell (PVIL)

Football - 
1947(PVIL-1A)^, 1948(PVIL-1A)

^Co-Champions

State finalists
Denison (UIL)

Football - 
1995(4A), 1996(4A), 1997(4A)

Rivalry
Denison High School and neighboring Sherman High School have had a long-standing football rivalry dating back to 1901. Each year, the schools play for "The Battle of the Ax" in which an engraved ax is awarded to the winner. This is the longest continuous rivalry among all high schools in the state of Texas.

Notable alumni
Chesley Sullenberger (Class of 1969) - Airline pilot and safety expert
SoMo (Class of 2006) - Singer/Songwriter
Jordan Taylor (Class of 2010) - NFL wide receiver

References

External links
 

Schools in Grayson County, Texas
Public high schools in Texas